Hopeland is an outer suburb of the Western Australian capital city of Perth, located in the Shire of Serpentine-Jarrahdale. It was established in 1923 as Group 46 of the Group Settlement Scheme on Peel Estate; the name was in use for some time and it was established as a suburb name on 1 May 1997.

References

Suburbs of Perth, Western Australia
Shire of Serpentine-Jarrahdale